Ktiš is a municipality and village in Prachatice District in the South Bohemian Region of the Czech Republic. It has about 500 inhabitants.

Administrative parts
Villages and hamlets of Březovík, Dobročkov, Ktiš-Pila, Miletínky, Smědeč, Smědeček, Tisovka and Třebovice are administrative parts of Ktiš.

References

Villages in Prachatice District